Hervé Kambou (born 1 May 1985) is an Ivorian professional footballer who plays for Peruvian club Asociación Deportiva Tarma.

Club career
Kambou began his career at Jean-Marc Guillou's football school Académie de Sol Beni, joined than 2004 to Toumodi FC and one year later to Thailand club BEC Tero Sasana FC. In the 2007–08 season he played for R.O.C. de Charleroi-Marchienne in the Belgian Second Division, he leave the club after one year moved than in Summer 2008 to SC Bastia. In 2014, he joined Peruvian club Willy Serrato. Since then, he has remained playing in Peru, just leaving to play for Venezuelan club Zulia FC in the second half of 2017. Over the years, he became a naturalized citizen of Peru.

International career
Kambou represented his country at the 2008 Olympic Games.

External links
LFP Profile

References

1985 births
Living people
Footballers from Abidjan
Ivorian footballers
Association football defenders
Toumodi FC players
Herve Kambou
R. Olympic Charleroi Châtelet Farciennes players
SC Bastia players
Club Africain players
Serrato Pacasmayo players
Sport Boys footballers
Zulia F.C. players
Academia Deportiva Cantolao players
Deportivo Binacional FC players
Olympic footballers of Ivory Coast
Footballers at the 2008 Summer Olympics
Ivorian expatriate footballers
Ivorian expatriate sportspeople in Thailand
Expatriate footballers in Thailand
Ivorian expatriate sportspeople in Belgium
Expatriate footballers in Belgium
Ivorian expatriate sportspeople in France
Expatriate footballers in France
Ivorian emigrants to Peru
Naturalized citizens of Peru
Ivorian expatriate sportspeople in Venezuela
Expatriate footballers in Venezuela